Wiener Eislaufverein (Wiener EV, WEV; Vienna Ice Skating Club) is an ice-sports club located in Vienna, Austria. They were founded in 1867 and the club’s greatest successes have been in ice hockey, figure skating, and speed skating. The club also operates one of the largest open-air ice rinks in the world on the Heumarkt in Vienna, with over 6,000 m² of ice surface.

The men’s representative ice hockey team was established in 1914 and won fourteen Austrian Championship titles. Their home arena was Albert Schultz Halle. The Wiener EV ice hockey program was succeeded by the Wiener Eislöwen-Verein. The club’s ice hockey junior teams played their last season under the Wiener EV name in 1999–2000.

Achievements
Austrian Ice Hockey Champion (13) : 1923, 1924, 1926, 1927, 1928, 1929, 1930, 1931, 1933, 1937, 1947, 1948, 1962
Austrian ice hockey runner-up (6) : 1972, 1980, 1981, 1987, 1988

References

Defunct ice hockey teams in Austria
Former Austrian Hockey League teams
Interliga (1999–2007) teams
Alpenliga teams
Sport in Vienna
Ice hockey clubs established in 1914
Ice hockey clubs disestablished in 2000
1914 establishments in Austria-Hungary
2000 disestablishments in Austria
Establishments in the Empire of Austria (1867–1918)